VSH is an abbreviation with several meanings.

Varroa sensitive hygiene in beekeeping
Vector spherical harmonics in mathematics
Very smooth hash in cryptography
Astronaute Club Européen's VSH project, aiming to develop a suborbital human spacecraft
company stock code for Vishay Intertechnology
VSH News a TV station in Pakistan
VSH is the internal name used by Sony for the XrossMediaBar (XMB)